The following is a list of ballot measures (also known as referendums, ballot questions, proposals, initiatives, propositions and proposals) which were on the ballot for the 2022 United States elections. Some were held prior to the federal elections on November 8. Many were initiated by state legislatures, while others were initiated by public petitions.

There were no state-wide ballot measures in 2022 for the states of Connecticut, Delaware, Hawaii, Indiana, Maine, Minnesota, Mississippi, New Jersey, North Carolina, Oklahoma, Pennsylvania, Virginia and Wisconsin.

Alabama

Alaska

Arizona

Arkansas

California

Colorado

Florida

Georgia

Idaho

Illinois

Iowa

Kansas

Kentucky

Louisiana

Maryland

Massachusetts

Michigan

Missouri

Montana

Nebraska

Nevada

New Hampshire

New Mexico

New York

North Dakota

Ohio

Oregon

Rhode Island

South Carolina

South Dakota

Tennessee

Texas

Utah

Vermont

Washington

District of Columbia

West Virginia

Wyoming

References